Emerson Rodríguez may refer to:

  (born 1983), Colombian actor
 Emerson Rodríguez (footballer) (born 2000), Colombian footballer
 Emerson Rodríguez (volleyball) (born 1993), Venezuelan volleyball player